Sol (Portuguese for Sun)  is a Portuguese language weekly national newspaper published every Saturday in Lisbon, Portugal. It leans on the right wing of the political spectrum.

History and profile
Sol was first published on 16 September 2006. The paper was founded by José António Saraiva with the premise to compete with the long-established Expresso.

Sol is directly owned by Mário Ramires through Newsplex

The circulation of Sol was 49,000 copies in 2008. The paper had a circulation of 33,089 copies in 2011.

Sol appeared in the Portuguese market as a competitor of Expresso which until now (2022) maintains a clearly leading position.

References

External links
Sol official website

2006 establishments in Portugal
Newspapers published in Lisbon
Portuguese-language newspapers
Publications established in 2006
Weekly newspapers published in Portugal
Portuguese news websites